SS Gallic was a paddle steamer that built in Scotland 1894 as Birkenhead, renamed Gallic in 1907 and scrapped in Liverpool in 1914. She was designed and built as a Mersey Ferry for Birkenhead Corporation. White Star Line bought her in 1907 to use as a passenger tender, and renamed her Gallic.

John Scott & Co built Birkenhead at its Abden shipyard in Kinghorn in Fife as yard number 87. She was launched on 7 June 1894 and completed that same month.

Birkenhead was a side-wheel paddle steamer. Each wheel was driven by a four-cylinder diagonal compound steam engine.

Birkenhead Council registered Birkenhead at Liverpool. Her United Kingdom official number was 102164.

White Star Line based Gallic at Cherbourg. She was soon considered too small for tending the company's increasingly large ocean liners.

Gallic was retained for a short time at Cherbourg, where she was occasionally used as a baggage vessel. The success of Nomadic and Traffic obviated the need for Gallic and she was scrapped at Garston, Liverpool in 1914 after a short period of being laid up.

References

External links

1894 ships
Paddle steamers of the United Kingdom
Passenger ships of the United Kingdom
Ships built in Scotland
Ships of the White Star Line